Alive Day Memories: Home from Iraq is a 2007 documentary television film featuring interviews with Iraq War amputees.

Summary
The veterans tell producer James Gandolfini of how they received their injuries, and the emotional effect that it has had on them.

Accolades
Television Academy Honors

References

External links
 Alive Day Memories at HBO
 

2007 television films
2007 documentary films
2007 films
Television Academy Honors winners
Documentary films about the Iraq War
Films directed by Ellen Goosenberg Kent